The Verdict is the fifteenth studio album by American heavy metal band Queensrÿche. It was released on March 1, 2019, through Century Media. It is the third studio album recorded with vocalist Todd La Torre, who additionally performed drum parts on the album due to the absence of drummer Scott Rockenfield, making it the first album since 2009's American Soldier to be recorded as a four piece band, and the band's last album with rhythm guitarist Parker Lundgren. The record was produced by Chris "Zeuss" Harris.

The first single from the album, "Man the Machine", was released on November 16, 2018. This was followed by the second single, "Dark Reverie", on January 11, 2019. Additionally, a music video was made for "Blood of the Levant".

Reception
Louder Sound described the album as '...an improvement on their 2015 album Condition Hüman, it has all of the hallmarks of the band’s early classics – the heavy metal power and prog rock finesse, the majestic twin-guitar harmonies and glass-shattering vocals.'

Track listing

Personnel
Queensrÿche
Todd La Torre – lead vocals, drums
Michael Wilton – lead guitar
Parker Lundgren – rhythm guitar
Eddie Jackson – bass, backing vocals

Production
 Zeuss – production, engineering, mixing, mastering

Charts

References

2019 albums
Queensrÿche albums
Century Media Records albums
Albums produced by Chris "Zeuss" Harris